The West Dunbartonshire Community Party is a minor political party involved in local government elections in West Dunbartonshire, Scotland. The party was formed in 2015 to contest the 2017 West Dunbartonshire Council election.

History
In 2015, the party was founded by Drew MacEoghainn along with other community activists. It was decided that the party should have no leader giving an equal say to all members. The Scottish Socialist Party's only elected representative, Councillor Jim Bollan, and his independent colleague, Councillor George Black, joined the party in 2016. The two councillors retained their existing designations until the council was dissolved in early 2017 in preparation for the election that May.

In the election, only Bollan was elected to represent the party, with Black losing his seat in Dumbarton ward.

Bollan retained his seat in the 2022 elections.

References

Political parties established in 2016
2016 establishments in Scotland
Locally based political parties in Scotland